Windy Valley is a glacier-filled valley opening onto the north part of Mikkelsen Bay on the west coast of Graham Land and providing access via its head to the plateau, Lammers Glacier and the Traffic Circle area. So named by the British Graham Land Expedition (BGLE) under Rymill, 1934–37, because of the strong winds which descend from the high plateau and blow out of this valley with great force.

Valleys of Graham Land
Fallières Coast